Bergen auf Rügen is a railway station in the town of Bergen auf Rügen, Mecklenburg-Vorpommern, Germany. The station lies on the Stralsund-Sassnitz railway and Bergen auf Rügen–Lauterbach Mole railway and was opened in 1883. The train services are operated by Deutsche Bahn Fernverkehr, Ostdeutsche Eisenbahn GmbH and Pressnitztalbahn. The narrow gauge line to Altenkirchen was closed in 1970.

Rail services
The station is served by the following services:

Long distance

The IC/ICE trains (Stuttgart –) Hamburg – Stralsund usually run on their main line to Stralsund every two hours, some trains run to Binz via Bergen auf Rügen (especially in the summer). Intercity-Express pairs from Munich run only at the weekend and also only in the summer period to Binz, otherwise these trains end in Stralsund.

Regional services

References

Railway stations in Mecklenburg-Western Pomerania
Bergen auf Rügen
Buildings and structures in Vorpommern-Rügen
Railway stations in Germany opened in 1883